Second Chance is an American game show that ran from March 7 to July 15, 1977 on ABC. Jim Peck hosted, with Jay Stewart and Jack Clark serving as announcers. The show was a production of the Carruthers Company in association with Warner Bros. Television.

Second Chance was later retooled into Press Your Luck.

Game play
Three contestants competed on each program.

Like its successor series six years later, Second Chance saw contestants answer trivia questions in order to earn spins on a large game board with various cash amounts and prizes. Two rounds of play, consisting of one question round and one board round, were played.

Question round
Each question round consisted of three questions. After hearing the question, the contestants had five seconds to write their answers on pieces of cardboard and place the answers in a slot in front of them. None of the contestants could see what the others had answered.

Once the contestants answered, Peck would inform the contestants that at least one or two of them was either right or wrong (or that the contestants had all given the same answer). He then gave the contestants a choice of whether to stick with their answers or take a second chance by changing their answer to one of three choices provided by Peck.

Correct answers earned points which were converted to "spins" in the second half of the round. Three points were awarded for a correct initial answer; one point was awarded for a correct "second chance" answer.

Board round

Each contestant used their spins to accumulate money and prizes on an 18-space game board. To do this, the contestants used a buzzer in front of them to stop a flashing randomizer light which moved in a pattern around the board at a high speed, and whatever the randomizer landed on when the contestant stopped it was given to him/her.

The gameboard featured nine cash squares with orange and yellow backgrounds and six squares with gift boxes in them which were used to represent prizes. Once one of these was landed on, a slide showing a prize was revealed and the prize's value was added to the contestant's score. There were also three squares with a cartoon figure referred to as the Devil in them. Hitting one of these cost a contestant whatever he/she had earned to that point, and hitting the Devil four times eliminated a contestant from the game. Unlike the board from the future Press Your Luck, the squares on this board did not change as the randomizer moved; additionally, the randomizer light moved at a much faster pace than Press Your Luck'''s board ever did.

Initially, the top dollar value in the first round was $2,500 and $5,000 in the second. Later, the second round also rewarded contestants that hit the top dollar value with an additional spin. Later still, the top value decreased to $1,000 in the first round. In the second round, a randomizer with an eggcrate display was placed in the big money square and its value could be anywhere between $1,000 and $5,000 in increments of $1,000. Prizes were typically worth less than $1,000 in the first round and significantly more in the second.

In both rounds when the contestants faced the board, play began with the contestant with the fewest spins and went in ascending order. If any of the contestants were tied, the contestant closest to Peck was given first chance. At any time, a contestant could pass his/her remaining spins. If any of the trailing contestants passed, those spins went to the leader. If the leader passed, they went to the contestant in second place unless there was a tie, in which case the contestant got to select which contestant received them. The contestant receiving the passed spins was forced to take all of them. If a Devil was hit, all of the remaining passed spins (if there were any) became earned spins and the contestant could do what they wanted with them. If the big money square was landed on with a passed spin in the second round, the contestant earned a regular spin.

The contestant in the lead at the end of the second board playing won the game, and kept whatever cash and/or prizes he/she earned. This show did not have returning champions.

Broadcast historySecond Chance debuted on March 7, 1977, at noon ET/11:00 AM CT/MT/PT, replacing a short-lived variety series starring Don Ho (which had itself replaced Peck's Hot Seat on October 25, 1976). Almost immediately the series faced problems as the Noon timeslot on the networks was long subject to preemptions for local newscasts and other programming. The CBS soap opera The Young and the Restless, which was starting to become a ratings success in its fourth season, also proved troublesome for Second Chance in the timeslot (NBC, which aired Name That Tune and Shoot for the Stars at Noon during the first three months of Second Chance's run, was also struggling).

Unable to compete with the hit soap on CBS, Second Chance came to an end after nineteen weeks and aired its final episode on July 15, 1977. The Goodson-Todman game show The Better Sex replaced it the following Monday; that show was placed on hiatus after almost six months in January 1978 in order to allow both General Hospital and One Life to Live to expand to an hour (The Better Sex would ultimately be canceled outright later that year).

Episode status
Three pilots were made for Second Chance. Only the third pilot exists. The episodes aired May 31 and June 27, 1977, and the series finale (albeit only in audio form) are the only three episodes of the aired series existing to this day. An opening sequence announced by Jack Clark is also available (albeit in audio form).

Press Your LuckPress Your Luck, a retooling of Second Chance, later aired on CBS from 1983 until 1986. Although both shows featured nearly-identical gameplay, Press Your Luck employed a more colorful, constantly changing gameboard, its villain was the animated "Whammy", and its question rounds were conducted differently. Also, the leader at the end of the first round got to play the board last in the second round while the contestant with the lowest score or, in case of a tie, the leftmost player went first. Also, contestants stayed on the show until they were defeated, won for five straight days, or amassed $25K or more in winnings (raised to $50K or more on November 1, 1984).

The ABC version began in 2019. Unlike the CBS version, contestants appeared only once, and the winner after two Big Board rounds played the Bonus Round for up to $1,000,000.

Australian version
The show ran in Australia in 1977 on Network Ten hosted by Earle Bailey and Christine Broadway and produced by Reg Grundy. There was later an Australian version of Press Your Luck'' from 1987 to 1988 on Seven Network hosted by Ian Turpie and also produced by Grundy.

References

External links
 

American Broadcasting Company original programming
1970s American game shows
1977 American television series debuts
1977 American television series endings
1970s Australian game shows
Television series by Warner Bros. Television Studios